Pietro D'Ali (born 5 July 1963) is an Italian former yacht racer who competed in the 2000 Summer Olympics.
 
He sailed on Brooksfield in the 1993–94 Whitbread Round the World Race.

He joined Prada Challenge and was part of their campaigns for the 2000 and 2003 Louis Vuitton Cup.

References

1963 births
Living people
Italian male sailors (sport)
Olympic sailors of Italy
Sailors at the 2000 Summer Olympics – Star
Volvo Ocean Race sailors
Luna Rossa Challenge sailors
2000 America's Cup sailors
2003 America's Cup sailors